The 1993–94 NBA season was the sixth season for the Miami Heat in the National Basketball Association (NBA). During the off-season, the Heat signed free agent 7' 7" center Manute Bol, but released him to free agency after only just eight games. Led by the scoring and shooting of Glen Rice and Steve Smith, and the rebounding of Rony Seikaly, the Heat got off to a 16–13 start before losing seven straight games afterwards in January, and held a 23–24 record at the All-Star break. However, they would post a 7-game winning streak between February and March, but would then lose 13 of their final 18 games, finishing the regular season fourth in the Atlantic Division with their first winning record at 42–40. The Heat went on to make their second playoff appearance earning the #8 seed in the Eastern Conference.

Rice led the team in scoring with 21.1 points per game, while Smith averaged 17.3 points and 5.1 assists per game, and Seikaly provided the team with 15.1 points, 10.3 rebounds and 1.4 blocks per game. In addition, Grant Long provided with 11.4 points and 7.2 rebounds per game, while second-year guard Harold Miner contributed 10.5 points per game, but only played 63 games due to a knee injury, and Brian Shaw contributed 9.0 points and 5.0 assists per game.

In the Eastern Conference First Round of the playoffs, the Heat faced the top-seeded Atlanta Hawks. Miami would win their first playoff game in franchise history 93–88 in Game 1 on April 28, 1994. However, in Game 2 at The Omni, a brawl occurred which involved Long choking Hawks forward Duane Ferrell after fouling him. Long was suspended for one game while Heat forward Keith Askins, and Hawks reserve Doug Edwards were also both suspended for their altercation off the bench (Askins was suspended for 3 games, and Edwards was suspended for 2 games). After taking a 2–1 series lead, the Heat would lose in five games.

Following the season, Shaw signed as a free agent with the Orlando Magic, and Willie Burton signed with the Philadelphia 76ers.

NBA Draft

Roster

Regular season

Season standings

z – clinched division title
y – clinched division title
x – clinched playoff spot

Record vs. opponents

Game log

Regular season

|- align="center"
|colspan="9" bgcolor="#bbcaff"|All-Star Break
|- style="background:#cfc;"
|- bgcolor="#bbffbb"

Playoffs

|- align="center" bgcolor="#ccffcc"
| 1
| April 28
| @ Atlanta
| W 93–88
| Steve Smith (22)
| Glen Rice (10)
| Bimbo Coles (5)
| The Omni11,543
| 1–0
|- align="center" bgcolor="#ffcccc"
| 2
| April 30
| @ Atlanta
| L 86–104
| Steve Smith (24)
| Steve Smith (9)
| four players tied (2)
| The Omni16,368
| 1–1
|- align="center" bgcolor="#ccffcc"
| 3
| May 3
| Atlanta
| W 90–86
| Steve Smith (25)
| Rony Seikaly (20)
| Brian Shaw (4)
| Miami Arena15,200
| 2–1
|- align="center" bgcolor="#ffcccc"
| 4
| May 5
| Atlanta
| L 89–103
| Bimbo Coles (18)
| Rony Seikaly (8)
| Bimbo Coles (7)
| Miami Arena15,200
| 2–2
|- align="center" bgcolor="#ffcccc"
| 5
| May 8
| @ Atlanta
| L 91–102
| Grant Long (22)
| Grant Long (10)
| Rony Seikaly (4)
| The Omni14,472
| 2–3
|-

Player statistics

NOTE: Please write the players statistics in alphabetical order by last name.

Season

Playoffs

Awards and records

Transactions

References

 1993-94 Miami Heat

Miami Heat seasons
Miami Heat
Miami Heat
Miami Heat